Simon Edmund Thomas (born April 12, 1990) is a Canadian professional soccer player who plays as a goalkeeper for Norwegian club Tromsø.

Club career

Youth and amateur
Thomas attended Oak Bay High School and played club soccer for the Victoria United U-18 Metro team before joining the Vancouver Whitecaps residency program.

Professional
Thomas played with the Vancouver Whitecaps Residency squad in the team's first USL Premier Development League season in 2008, before being called up to the senior Vancouver Whitecaps side. He spent the 2009 season back in the PDL playing for the Vancouver Whitecaps Residency squad, before being recalled to the senior Whitecaps squad for the 2010 season.

Thomas made his professional debut on September 11, 2010 against Crystal Palace Baltimore, coming on as a late substitute for Jay Nolly.

On August 5, 2011, after a successful trial period, he signed a one-year contract with English side Huddersfield Town. He left the club in June 2012, after not being offered a new contract by the manager, Simon Grayson. He did not make a single first team appearance for the club.

Thomas spent three months playing a series of exhibition games for Calgary Foothills in 2014.

In August 2014 Thomas joined Football League Two club Newport County on a short contract to cover injuries. He left the club September 1, 2014 having not made a first team appearance, though he was regularly on the substitutes bench for League Two matches.

Thomas signed a contract with OBOS-ligaen club Strømmen prior to the 2015 season. As the first choice goalkeeper, he started 28 of the club's 30 matches in 2015, and broke club records for fewest goals against, and most shutouts in a season.

In November 2015 Thomas joined Tippeligaen club Bodø/Glimt on a three-year deal.

In early 2018, Thomas joined Kongsvinger in the OBOS-ligaen.

After only a few months with Kongsvinger, Thomas switched to fellow 2nd tier side Strømmen, where he played in 2015.

On February 18, 2019, he signed with newly promoted Norwegian First Division club KFUM-Kameratene Oslo.

In September 2020, Thomas would sign with Eliteserien club Sarpsborg 08.

Career statistics

International career
Thomas received his first call up to the Canada Under-23 squad on the March 9, 2012, for the 2012 CONCACAF Men's Olympic Qualifying Tournament.

Thomas made his senior team debut on January 26, 2013, in a friendly against Denmark as a second half sub for Lars Hirschfeld, the game ended as a 4–0 defeat. Days later he played the full 90 minutes and kept a clean sheet in a 0–0 draw with the United States. On June 27, 2013, Thomas was listed as a part of the confirmed 23-man squad for Colin Miller's Canada squad for 2013 CONCACAF Gold Cup.

After becoming the first choice goalkeeper for Strømmen, Thomas was listed as part of the 23 man roster for a friendly against Ghana, as well as 2018 World Cup Qualifiers against Honduras and El Salvador.

References

External links
 
 
 Vancouver Whitecaps bio
 

1990 births
Living people
Association football goalkeepers
Canadian soccer players
Soccer players from Victoria, British Columbia
Canadian expatriate soccer players
Expatriate footballers in England
Canadian expatriate sportspeople in England
Expatriate footballers in Wales
Canadian expatriate sportspeople in Wales
Expatriate footballers in Norway
Canadian expatriate sportspeople in Norway
Vancouver Whitecaps Residency players
Vancouver Whitecaps (1986–2010) players
Huddersfield Town A.F.C. players
Vancouver Whitecaps FC players
Vancouver Whitecaps FC U-23 players
FC Edmonton players
Newport County A.F.C. players
Strømmen IF players
FK Bodø/Glimt players
Kongsvinger IL Toppfotball players
KFUM-Kameratene Oslo players
Sarpsborg 08 FF players
USL League Two players
USSF Division 2 Professional League players
Norwegian First Division players
Eliteserien players
Canada men's international soccer players
2013 CONCACAF Gold Cup players